Northwestern Medicine Central DuPage Hospital (CDH) is a 390-bed hospital in Winfield, Illinois, United States, one of twelve hospitals operated by Northwestern Medicine. CDH was the first hospital in DuPage County to perform open heart surgery and the first to perform closed-chest, robot-assisted cardiac bypass surgery in the State of Illinois. , the hospital was ranked 8th on the "Best Hospitals in Illinois" list by U.S. News & World Report, but was not nationally ranked in any specialty.

History
The Central DuPage Hospital Association was established in 1958 when citizens from Glen Ellyn, Lombard, Wheaton, Warrenville, Winfield and West Chicago banded together to restore a sanitarium located on the hospital's current primary site. After an extensive million-dollar renovation project, Central DuPage Hospital opened on September 16, 1964 with 113 beds and 66 physicians. The hospital saw much change throughout the 1970s, with the opening of a 120-bed pavilion on December 13, 1970, small additions in 1971 and 1972, and a five-story 112-bed patient tower in 1976.  The facility and campus continued to expand in the decades that followed, with much of the original structure eventually reused or demolished, culminating in the construction of a new $232 million five-story bed tower with 202 private rooms in 2011.

In 2011, Central DuPage Health (the successor parent to the Central DuPage Hospital Association) merged with Delnor Health System, the parent of Delnor Hospital of Geneva, Illinois, to form Cadence Health System.  Cadence, in turn, was then acquired by Northwestern Memorial HealthCare, parent of Chicago's Northwestern Memorial Hospital, in 2015.

Awards and rankings 
 100 Top Hospitals by Truven Health Analytics (2006-2010, 2012, 2013, 2014, 2015)
 The LeapFrog Group Top Hospital (2014)
 Nationally Ranked for Orthopaedic Care by U.S. News & World Report (2009, 2012, 2013, 2014)
 Magnet Recognition For Nursing Excellence (2010)

Services 
 Community Health & Outreach
 Diabetes Education
 Diagnostic Imaging Services
 Dialysis Services
 Emergency & Trauma Services
 Employee Assistance Program
 Endoscopy Services
 Fitness & Wellness Services
 Home Health & Hospice Services
 Infusion Services
 Lab Services
 Nutrition Services
 Occupational Health Services
 Pain Management Services
 Rehabilitation Services
 Senior Services
 Surgical Services
 Travel Medicine & Immunization Services
 Walk-In Clinics
 Wound Care Services

Primary care services 
 Northwestern Medicine Regional Medical Group
 Family Medicine
 Internal Medicine
 Obstetrics & Gynecology
 Pediatrics

Specialized care 
 Behavioral Health 
 Northwestern Medicine Regional Medical Group
 Cancer (Oncology)
 Heart & Vascular 
 Neurosciences
 Orthopedics
 Palliative Medicine
 Pediatric Specialty Care
 Respiratory Health 
 Weight Management
 Women's Health

References

External links

1958 establishments in Illinois
Buildings and structures in DuPage County, Illinois
Companies based in DuPage County, Illinois
Hospital buildings completed in 1964
Hospitals established in 1964
Hospitals in Illinois
Northwestern Medicine
Organizations established in 1958
Tuberculosis sanatoria in the United States
Winfield, Illinois